Jack Kirk Stretton (born 6 September 2001) is a professional footballer who plays as a forward for Stockport County.

Club career

Derby County
Stretton made his debut for Derby County as a substitute in a 1–1 draw with Wycombe Wanderers on 28 November 2020.

On 8 March 2021, Stretton joined National League side Stockport County on loan for a month. On 9 March 2021, Stretton came off the bench to score on his debut in 5–0 away win against Solihull Moors.

He scored his first goal for Derby in a 2–1 loss at Peterborough United on 14 August 2021.

On 4 August 2022, Stretton joined EFL League Two club Carlisle United on a season-long loan deal.

Stockport County
On 7 January 2023, Stretton was recalled from his loan at Carlisle to allow him to return to Stockport County for an undisclosed fee on a two-and-a-half year deal.

International career
Stretton has represented Scotland at U19 level.

Career statistics

References

2001 births
Living people
English footballers
Scottish footballers
Scotland youth international footballers
Association football forwards
Derby County F.C. players
Stockport County F.C. players
Carlisle United F.C. players
English people of Scottish descent
English Football League players
National League (English football) players